Oceanobacillus oncorhynchi is a halotolerant, obligately alkaliphilic bacterium first isolated from the skin of a rainbow trout (Oncorhynchus mykiss), hence its name. It is Gram-positive, rod-shaped and motile by peritrichous flagella and produces ellipsoidal spores. The type strain is R-2(T) (=JCM 12661(T) =NCIMB 14022(T)).

References

Further reading
Staley, James T., et al. "Bergey's manual of systematic bacteriology, vol. 3."Williams and Wilkins, Baltimore, MD (1989): 2250–2251.

External links

LPSN
Type strain of Oceanobacillus oncorhynchi at BacDive -  the Bacterial Diversity Metadatabase

Bacillaceae
Bacteria described in 2005